Odo of Arezzo or Abbot Oddo was a medieval monk who worked in Arezzo, active as composer and music theorist.

Life and career
Little is known about his life, except that he was an Abbot in Arezzo, working under Bishop Donatus of Arezzo. Odo composed a tonary (a book of chants which usually included antiphons and responsories) with a discussion of modes, which survives in twenty manuscripts, four of which contain attributions to Odo. In several of the manuscripts a prologue ascribed in three out of six to Odo is entitled "Formulas quas vobis".

References

Citations

Sources

Further reading
 
 

10th-century births
Year of death unknown
Medieval male composers
Italian male classical composers
10th-century composers
10th-century Italian clergy
People from Arezzo